İsakənd (also, Isakend) is a village and municipality in the Tovuz Rayon of Azerbaijan.  It has a population of 1,029.  The municipality consists of the villages of İsakənd, Aşralar, Ağdərə, and Qarabağlılar.

References 

Populated places in Tovuz District